Lakeview, Ontario may refer to:

Lakeview, Elgin County, Ontario
Lakeview, Mississauga, Ontario
Lakeview, Simcoe County, Ontario